Resurgam is a solo studio album by American hip hop musician Alias. It was released on Anticon in 2008. It features guest appearances from Yoni Wolf and The One AM Radio. The title is Latin for "I shall rise again".

Critical reception
At Metacritic, which assigns a weighted average score out of 100 to reviews from mainstream critics, Resurgam received an average score of 79% based on 6 reviews, indicating "generally favorable reviews".

David Jeffries of AllMusic gave the album 4 stars out of 5, saying: "Putting paranoia and noir to the side for the moment, Alias has created his most welcoming and positive dream world on Resurgam, an album where the creaks comfort and the low cloud cover comes off as heavenly." Mia Lily Clarke of Pitchfork gave the album a 7.0 out of 10, saying: "While Resurgam is a record of many different moods, and unashamedly derivative of Alias' influences, it maintains a distinctive, concrete consistency." She added: "This is largely due to Alias' impressive talent for arrangements; the material is deftly woven with a great ear for detail, and there really is something to appeal to almost everyone."

Track listing

Personnel
Credits adapted from liner notes.

 Alias – production, arrangement, recording, mixing, mastering
 Yoni Wolf – lyrics (3), vocals (3), Rhodes piano (3), bass guitar (3)
 Hrishikesh Hirway – lyrics (11), vocals (11), guitar (11), trumpet (11), bells (11)
 Sam Flax Keener – art direction, layout
 Jenn Whitney – photography

References

External links
 

2008 albums
Alias (musician) albums
Anticon albums